Firas Ibrahim Al-Hawari is the Jordanian Minister of Health. He was appointed as minister on 29 March 2021.

References 

Living people
Government ministers of Jordan
21st-century Jordanian politicians
Health ministers of Jordan
Year of birth missing (living people)